Dragan Kiriakov Tsankov (9 November 1828 – 24 March 1911) was a Bulgarian politician and the first Liberal Party Prime Minister of the country.

He was born in Svishtov. Tsankov was initially a civil servant in the administration of the Ottoman Empire, who in the 1850s gained a reputation as a supporter of the Bulgarian Greek Catholic Church. His paper Bũlgaria appeared in Constantinople in 1859 and espoused his religious positions. Funded by France, the paper argued that a Uniat with Rome was the only solution to Bulgaria. Indeed, Tsankov, who was educated by the Jesuits, helped to form the Bulgarian Greek Catholic Church in 1861.

Later he became closely associated with opposition to the Ottomans and the independence movement. Tsankov was initially opposed to the April Uprising but he soon changed his opinion and began to be active in support of independence. He served as deputy to Nayden Gerov in the Governorship of Svishtov during the brief period of Russian administration in Bulgaria.A leading figure in the drive towards independence, he became respected as the voice of moderate liberalism, as he was prepared to work with the Conservatives after 1879.

After some failed attempts to form a Conservative-led administration, Tsankov was appointed as Prime Minister on 7 April 1880 with plans for a wide-ranging raft of reforms.  His new reforms, which included the establishment of a militia, limited rights for Muslims and attempts to limit the power of the Bulgarian Orthodox Church alarmed Alexander of Bulgaria, who feared the possibility of a liberal revolution. A series of foreign policy errors involving relations with Austria-Hungary followed (largely caused by the lack of communication between Tsankov and the Tsar) and his ministry was forced to resign before the year was out.

He initially kept an open mind about the military coup of 1881, although he eventually called on his supporters to oppose the new system by all legal means, resulting in him being placed under house arrest. However the failure of military rule forced Alexander to restore civilian government, with Tsankov returning as Premier on 19 September 1883 at the head of a coalition government.  Tsankov's second rule was seen as largely transitional and it also saw the Liberal Party splitting, with Petko Karavelov gaining a large groundswell of support. Eventually he was dismissed as Prime Minister and replaced by Karavelov in 1884.

After his removal from office, Tsankov split off to form his own party, the Progressive Liberals. Although the group did not see government until 1902 and the rule of Stoyan Danev, Tsankov remained an important figure in Bulgarian politics and a constant voice in support of ever closer relations with Russia until his death.

Literature / Works

Cankof, A. Kyriak & Cankof, D. Kyriak – Grammatik der bulgarischen Sprache (1852) / Grammar of the Bulgarian language

References

External links

 

	

1828 births
1911 deaths
Chairpersons of the National Assembly of Bulgaria
People from Svishtov
Liberal Party (Bulgaria) politicians
Progressive Liberal Party (Bulgaria) politicians
Prime Ministers of Bulgaria
Converts to Eastern Orthodoxy from Catholicism
Members of the Bulgarian Academy of Sciences
19th-century Bulgarian people
Members of the National Assembly (Bulgaria)